The Ministry of Education, Youth and Sports may refer to:

Ministry of Education, Youth and Sports (Cambodia)
Ministry of Education, Youth and Sports (Czech Republic)

See also
Ministry of Education, Sports and Youth, Albania